Communauté d'agglomération Mont-Saint-Michel-Normandie is a communauté d'agglomération, an intercommunal structure. It covers the southern part of the Manche department, in the Normandy region, northwestern France. Created in 2017, its seat is in Avranches. Its area is 1,543.9 km2. Its population was 87,613 in 2019.

Composition
The communauté d'agglomération consists of the following 95 communes:

Aucey-la-Plaine
Avranches
Bacilly
Barenton
Beauficel
Beauvoir
Brécey
Brouains
Buais-les-Monts
Céaux
La Chaise-Baudouin
La Chapelle-Urée
Chaulieu
Chavoy
Courtils
Les Cresnays
Crollon
Cuves
Dragey-Ronthon
Ducey-Les Chéris
Le Fresne-Poret
Gathemo
Genêts
Ger
La Godefroy
Le Grand-Celland
Grandparigny
Le Grippon
Hamelin
Huisnes-sur-Mer
Isigny-le-Buat
Juilley
Juvigny les Vallées
Lapenty
Lingeard
Les Loges-Marchis
Les Loges-sur-Brécey
Lolif
Le Luot
Marcey-les-Grèves
Marcilly
Le Mesnil-Adelée
Le Mesnil-Gilbert
Le Mesnillard
Le Mesnil-Ozenne
Montjoie-Saint-Martin
Le Mont-Saint-Michel
Mortain-Bocage
Moulines
Le Neufbourg
Notre-Dame-de-Livoye
Le Parc
Perriers-en-Beauficel
Le Petit-Celland
Poilley
Pontaubault
Pontorson
Ponts
Précey
Reffuveille
Romagny-Fontenay
Sacey
Saint-Aubin-de-Terregatte
Saint-Barthélemy
Saint-Brice
Saint-Brice-de-Landelles
Saint-Clément-Rancoudray
Saint-Cyr-du-Bailleul
Saint-Georges-de-Livoye
Saint-Georges-de-Rouelley
Saint-Hilaire-du-Harcouët
Saint-James
Saint-Jean-de-la-Haize
Saint-Jean-du-Corail-des-Bois
Saint-Jean-le-Thomas
Saint-Laurent-de-Cuves
Saint-Laurent-de-Terregatte
Saint-Loup
Saint-Michel-de-Montjoie
Saint-Nicolas-des-Bois
Saint-Ovin
Saint-Quentin-sur-le-Homme
Saint-Senier-de-Beuvron
Saint-Senier-sous-Avranches
Sartilly-Baie-Bocage
Savigny-le-Vieux
Servon
Sourdeval
Subligny
Tanis
Le Teilleul
Tirepied-sur-Sée
Vains
Le Val-Saint-Père
Vernix

References

Mont-Saint-Michel-Normandie
Mont-Saint-Michel-Normandie